WAYN (900 AM) is a radio station based in Rockingham, North Carolina. The station plays a variety of adult contemporary and easy listening music. It also carries Fox Sports Radio as well as North Carolina State University football and basketball Games.

With a daytime transmission power of 1,000 watts, and a night time transmission power of 297 watts. WAYN broadcasts from 6 a.m. to 10 p.m.

History
WAYN signed on in 1946. The first voice heard on the station was that of Robert D. Raiford, who later became a commentator for John Boy and Billy. In 2006, morning host Jimmy Smith celebrated 55 years on the station. He was 16 when he started, and still on the air at 76 to celebrate 60 years. Mayor Eugene McLaurin declared Jimmy Smith day in 2001 for his 50th anniversary. Smith retired in 2013 after 62 years.

References

External links

AYN
Mainstream adult contemporary radio stations in the United States
Sports radio stations in the United States